Ethyl acrylate is an organic compound with the formula CH2CHCO2CH2CH3.  It is the ethyl ester of acrylic acid.  It is a colourless liquid with a characteristic acrid odor.  It is mainly produced for paints, textiles, and non-woven fibers.  It is also a reagent in the synthesis of various pharmaceutical intermediates.

Production
Ethyl acrylate is produced by acid-catalysed esterification of acrylic acid, which in turn is produced by oxidation of propylene. It may also be prepared from acetylene, carbon monoxide and ethanol by a Reppe reaction.  Commercial preparations  contain a polymerization inhibitor such as hydroquinone, phenothiazine, or hydroquinone ethyl ether.

Reactions and uses

Precursor to polymers and other monomers
Ethyl acrylate is used in the production of polymers including resins, plastics, rubber, and denture material.

Ethyl acrylate is a reactant for homologous alkyl acrylates (acrylic esters) by transesterification with higher alcohols through acidic or basic catalysis. In that way speciality acrylates are made accessible, e.g. 2-ethylhexyl acrylate (from 2-ethylhexanol) used for pressure-sensitive adhesives, cyclohexyl acrylate (from cyclohexanol) used for automotive clear lacquers, 2-hydroxyethyl acrylate (from ethylene glycol) which is crosslinkable with diisocyanates to form gels used with long-chain acrylates (from C18+ alcohols) as comonomer for comb polymers for reduction of the solidification point of paraffin oils and 2-dimethylaminoethyl acrylate (from dimethylaminoethanol) for the preparation of flocculants for sewage clarification and paper production.

As a reactive monomer, ethyl acrylate is used in homopolymers and copolymers with e.g. ethene, acrylic acid and its salts, amides and esters, methacrylates, acrylonitrile, maleic esters, vinyl acetate, vinyl chloride, vinylidene chloride, styrene, butadiene and unsaturated polyesters. Copolymers of acrylic acid ethyl ester with ethene (EPA/ethylene-ethyl acrylate copolymers) are suitable as adhesives and polymer additives, just like ethene vinyl acetate copolymers. Copolymers with acrylic acid increase the cleaning effect of liquid detergents, copolymers with methacrylic acid are used as gastric juices tablet covers (Eudragit).

The large number of possible comonomer units and their combination in copolymers and terpolymers with ethyl acrylate allows the realization of different properties of the acrylate copolymers in a variety of applications in paints and adhesives, paper, textile and leather auxiliaries together with cosmetic and pharmaceutical products.

As Michael acceptor and HX acceptor
Ethyl acrylate reacts with amines catalyzed by Lewis acids in a Michael addition to β-alanine derivatives in high yields:

The nucleophilic addition at ethyl acrylate as an α,β-unsaturated carbonyl compound is a frequent strategy in the synthesis of pharmaceutical intermediates. Examples are the hypnotic glutethimide or the vasodilator vincamin (obsolete by now) or more recent therapeutics such as the COPD agent cilomilast or the nootropic leteprinim.

Ethyl 3-bromopropionate is prepared by hydrobromination of ethyl acrylate.

Dienophile
With dienes, ethyl acrylate reacts as a good dienophile in Diels–Alder reactions e.g. with buta-1,3-diene in a [4+2] cycloaddition reaction to give a cyclohexene carboxylic acid ester in a high yield.

Natural occurrence
Ethyl acrylate is also used as a flavoring agent. It has been found as a volatile component in pineapples and Beaufort cheese and is a secondary component in vanilla flavor obtained from heat extraction of vanilla in amounts of up to 1 ppm. In such high concentrations it negatively affects the extracted aroma.

Safety
The International Agency for Research on Cancer stated, "Overall evaluation, ethyl acrylate is possibly carcinogenic to humans (Group 2B)." The United States Environmental Protection Agency (EPA) states, "Human studies on occupational exposure to ethyl acrylate... have suggested a relationship between exposure to the chemical(s) and colorectal cancer, but the evidence is conflicting and inconclusive. In a study by the National Toxicology Program (NTP), increased incidence of squamous cell papillomas and carcinomas of the forestomach were observed in rats and mice exposed via gavage (experimentally placing the chemical in the stomach).  However, the NTP recently determined that these data were not relevant to human carcinogenicity since humans do not have a forestomach, and removed ethyl acrylate from its list of carcinogens." (Occupational exposure generally involves exposure that occurs regularly, over an extended period of time.)

It is toxic in large doses, with an LD50 (rats, oral) of 1020 mg/kg, and day to day continuous exposure to 5 ppm is considered safe. As of October 2018, the FDA withdrew authorization for its use as a synthetic flavoring substance in food, without regard to its continuing stance that this substance does not pose a risk to public health under the conditions of its intended use.

One favorable safety aspect is that ethyl acrylate has good warning properties; the odor threshold is much lower than any level of health concern. In other words, the bad odor warns people of ethyl acrylate's presence long before the concentration reaches a level capable of creating a serious health risk. Reports of the exact levels vary somewhat, but, for example, the U.S. E.P.A. reports an odor threshold of 0.0012 parts per million (ppm), but the E.P.A.'s lowest level of health concern, the Acute Exposure Guideline Level-1 (AEGL-1) is 8.3 ppm, which is almost 7000 times the odor threshold.

References

External links
CDC - NIOSH Pocket Guide to Chemical Hazards - Ethyl Acrylate

Monomers
Ethyl esters
Lachrymatory agents
IARC Group 2B carcinogens
Acrylate esters